Hanighen is a surname. Notable people with the surname include:

Bernie Hanighen (1908–1976), American songwriter and record producer
Frank Hanighen (1899–1964), American journalist